For the Canadian clergyman, see Clément Boulanger (Jesuit priest).

Clément Boulanger, who was born at Paris in 1805, studied under Ingres, and died in 1842 at Magnesia ad Maeandrum in Asia Minor (According to the memorial inscription at St. Polycarp church in Smyrna). His pictures are chiefly historical, but he also painted landscapes and portraits. The following are some of the principal:

Bordeaux. Museum.
Portrait of Cardinal Donnet, Archbishop of Bordeaux. 1839.
The Vintage of Médoc.

Lille. Museum. Procession of the Corpus Domini (signed and dated ROMAE 1830).
Nantes. Museum. Procession of the 'Ardents.'  1842.
Toulouse. Museum. Procession of the 'Gargouille' at Rouen. 1837.
Versailles. Gallery. Entry of the French Army into Moutiers.

He was the first husband of the painter Marie-Élisabeth Blavot.

References
 

19th-century French painters
French male painters
1805 births
1842 deaths
Painters from Paris
French expatriates in the Ottoman Empire
19th-century French male artists